The 2023 ASEAN Para Games, officially known as the 12th ASEAN Para Games, and commonly known as Cambodia 2023, are an upcoming biennial Southeast Asian multi-sport event for athletes with disabilities due to be held from 3 to 9 June 2023 in Phnom Penh, Cambodia. It is the first time that Cambodia hosted the ASEAN Para Games. Celebrated in the tradition of the ASEAN Para Games as governed by the ASEAN Para Sports Federation (APSF).

The Games

Participating nations
All 11 members of ASEAN Para Sports Federation (APSF) are expected to take part in the 2023 ASEAN para Games.

ASEAN Para Sports Federation

 
  (Host)

Medal table

Key

Sports
ASEAN Para Sports Federation and Cambodian ASEAN Para Games Organizing Committee (CAMAPGOC) in 29 July 2022 agreed on 12 initial sports for the Games during a meeting held in Surakarta, Indonesia.

References

ASEAN Para Games
ASEAN
ASEAN